Scotty Anderson (born November 24, 1979) is a former American football wide receiver in the National Football League (NFL) and the Arena Football League (AFL).  He played college football for Grambling State University.

High school years
Anderson attended Jonesboro-Hodge High School in Louisiana and was a letterman in football.

College career
As a wide receiver for the Grambling Tigers, Anderson had a total of 69 receptions for 1146 yards and 10 touchdowns his senior season. Anderson holds the Grambling State career record with 195 receptions for 3,334 yards and 35 touchdowns. Anderson, A three-year starter, he became the only player in school history to gain over 1,000 yards receiving in a season twice (1999–2000). He was an All-American first-team selection by the Associated Press, The Sports Network, Sports Xchange and Sheridan Broadcasting Network & Black College Sports as a senior.

Professional career

NFL
Anderson was drafted by the Detroit Lions in the 2001 NFL Draft in the fifth round. He then spent 2001-2003 with them. His career totals in 34 games are 54 receptions for 858 yards and 4 touchdowns.

AFL
He played for the Grand Rapids Rampage in the AFL in the 2007 season.

Family
His two brothers played in the NFL. Anthony was a safety with the San Diego Chargers (1987), and Stevie was a wide receiver with the New York Jets (1994) and the Arizona Cardinals (1995–96).

See also
 List of Arena Football League and National Football League players

Notes

External links
 Profile at Fox Sports
 Profile at Yahoo
 Brothers Scotty and Stevie stabbed at nightclub
 Detroit Lions bio
 

1979 births
Living people
People from Jonesboro, Louisiana
American football wide receivers
Grambling State Tigers football players
Detroit Lions players
Grand Rapids Rampage players